The 2005–2006 LEB season was the 10th season of the Liga Española de Baloncesto, second tier of the Spanish basketball.

LEB Oro standings

LEB Oro Playoffs

Playoff seedings, results, and schedules

Quarter-finals

(1) Leon Caja España (26-8) vs. (8) Palma Aqua Magica (17-17)
Leon Caja España win the series 3-0 
Game 1 May 4 @ Leon: Leon Caja España 86, Palma Aqua Magica 74
Game 2 May 6 @ Leon: Leon Caja España 71, Palma Aqua Magica 69
Game 3 May 9 @ Palma de Mallorca: Palma Aqua Magica 67, Leon Caja España 73

(2) Basket CAI Zaragoza (25-9) vs. (7) CB Tarragona (17-17)
 Basket CAI Zaragoza win the series 3-0 
Game 1 May 4 @ Zaragoza: Basket CAI Zaragoza 87, CB Tarragona 70
Game 2 May 6 @ Zaragoza: Basket CAI Zaragoza 73, CB Tarragona 63
Game 3 May 9 @ Tarragona: CB Tarragona 70, Basket CAI Zaragoza 80

(3) Polaris World Murcia (22-12)  vs. (6) CB L'Hospitalet (17-17)
 Polaris World Murcia win the series 3-0
Game 1 May 4 @ Murcia: Polaris World Murcia 88, CB L'Hospitalet 75
Game 2 May 6 @ Murcia: Polaris World Murcia 69, CB L'Hospitalet 57
Game 3 May 9 @ Hospitalet de Llobregat: CB Hospitalet 61, Polaris World Murcia 67
 
(4) Drac Inca (21-13) vs. (5) Bruesa GBC (27-17)
 Bruesa GBC win the series 3-0 
Game 1 May 4 @ Inca: Drac Inca 70, Bruesa GBC 79
Game 2 May 6 @ Inca: Drac Inca 74, Bruesa GBC 79 
Game 3 May 9 @ Donostia: Bruesa GBC 88, Drac Inca 82

Semifinals
(1) Leon Caja España (26-8) vs. (5) Bruesa GBC (27-17)
 Bruesa GBC win the series 3-0 and promote to League ACB 
Game 1 May 18 @ Leon: Bruesa GBC 79, Leon Caja España 72
Game 2 May 20 @ Leon: Leon Caja España 72, Bruesa GBC 73
Game 3 May 23 @ Donostia: Leon Caja España 81, Bruesa GBC 78

(2) Basket CAI Zaragoza (25-9) vs. (3) Polaris World Murcia (22-12)
 Polaris win the series 3-2 and promote to League ACB
Game 1 May 18 @ Zaragoza: Basket CAI Zaragoza 74, Polaris World Murcia 85
Game 2 May 20 @ Zaragoza: Basket CAI Zaragoza 85, Polaris World Murcia 73
Game 3 May 23 @ Murcia: Polaris World Murcia 71, Basket CAI Zaragoza 66
Game 4 May 25 @ Murcia: Polaris World Murcia 73, Basket CAI Zaragoza 76
Game 5 May 28 @ Zaragoza: Basket CAI Zaragoza 90, Polaris World Murcia 99

LEB Oro Finals
These two teams are already promoted to the league ACB.

(5) Bruesa GBC (27-17) vs. (3) Polaris World Murcia (22-12)
Game 1 June 1 @ Murcia: Bruesa GBC 92, Polaris World Murcia 86
Bruesa GBC: League LEB CHAMPION
Bruesa GBC and Polaris World Murcia: Promoted to League ACB

Relegation playoffs

Calpe Aguas de Calpe, relegated to LEB-2.

TV coverage
TVE2
Teledeporte

See also 
Liga Española de Baloncesto

LEB Oro seasons
LEB2
Second level Spanish basketball league seasons